Resy is an American online restaurant-reservation service company founded in 2014 by Gary Vaynerchuk, Ben Leventhal, and Michael Montero. As of 2023, the Resy app serves over 16,000 restaurants around the world.

History
Resy was founded in 2014 by Ben Leventhal, co-founder of Eater.com, Michael Montero, co-founder of CrowdTwist, and social-media entrepreneur Gary Vaynerchuk. In January 2017 the company raised $13 million from Airbnb, First Data Corporation and earlier investors RSE Ventures and Lerer Hippeau Ventures. In April 2018, Resy enabled participating restaurants to list their properties on Airbnb through Resy's booking system and also acquired ClubKviar, a restaurant-booking platform in Spain. In 2018, Resy acquired a competitor, Reserve, a reservation app launched by Garrett Camp's incubator, Expa.

In 2019, American Express acquired Resy and integrated it into its mobile app as an offering for some rewards card members. As of 2023, Resy has more than 35 million users.

See also
 List of websites about food and drink

References

External links
 

Online retailers of the United States
Retail companies established in 2014
Internet properties established in 2014
2019 mergers and acquisitions
Restaurant guides